Ray Laurence is professor of ancient history at Macquarie University. He has won the Routledge Ancient History Prize for his first book Roman Pompeii: Space and Society, and the Longman-History Today New Generation Prize for his book Pompeii: The Living City.

Selected publications

Roman Pompeii: Space and Society (1996) 
Pompeii: The Living City (2006) 
Growing Up and Growing Old in Ancient Rome (2001) 
The Roads of Roman Italy: Mobility and Cultural Change (2011) 
Roman Archaeology for Historians (2012) 
Rome, Ostia, Pompeii: Movement and Space (2012) 
The City in the Roman West (2011)

References 

Living people
Year of birth missing (living people)
Academic staff of Macquarie University
Alumni of the University of Wales
Alumni of Newcastle University